The Francis M. Pipkin Award is a physics prize given by the American Physical Society (APS) every two years since 1999.

The award was established in 1997 by the American Physical Society's the Topical Group on Precision Measurement and Fundamental Constants as a memorial tribute to Francis M. Pipkin (1925–1992). The award consists of $3,000 plus travel expenses to the APS meeting where the award is conferred. The award is intended for promising young physicists so the requirement for eligibility is that the award recipient must have held the Ph.D. degree for not more than 15 years prior to the nomination deadline. The APS award selection committee selects the award recipient from award nominees on the basis of outstanding research in precision measurement and fundamental physical constants, as represented by the nominees's publications and by three nominating letters containing supplemental information. All APS members, except the members of the APS award selection committee, are allowed to submit nominations.

Recipients
 1999: Steven Keith Lamoreaux
 2001: Jens H. Gundlach
 2003: Eric A. Hessels
 2005: Ronald L. Walsworth
 2007: David DeMille
 2009: Zheng-Tian Lu
 2011: Michael Romalis
 2013: Randolf Pohl
 2015: Holger Mueller
 2017: Jens Dilling
 2019: Tanya Zelevinsky
 2021: Andrew D. Ludlow
 2023: Andrew A. Geraci

References

Awards established in 1997
Awards of the American Physical Society